Franz Tamayo is a province in the Bolivian department of La Paz.  It lies in the western part of the nation, and includes the Ulla Ulla National Reserve - which today is part of the Apolobamba Integrated Management Natural Area - in the high Andean plain on the western border with Peru. Its capital is Apolo.

The province was founded with the name Caupollcán on January 23, 1826. On December 20, 1967 the name was changed in honor of the Bolivian intellectual, writer and politician Franz Tamayo (1878–1956).

Geography 
The Apolobamba mountain range traverses the province. Other mountains are listed below:

Subdivision 
Franz Tamayo Province is divided into two municipalities which are further subdivided into nine cantons.

Places of interest 
Some of the tourist attractions of the municipalities are:

In Apolo Municipality:
 San Juan de Asariamas dry forest in Apolo Canton. The dominant trees species are the Bilka (Anadenanthera macrocarpa), the Cuchi (Astronium urundeuva), and the Brazilian Soto (Schinopsis brasiliensis). 
 Machariapo River in Apolo Canton situated within Madidi National Park and Area of Integrated Management 
 the Inca bridge in Santa Teresa community and the Chiara Alto waterfall of 18 m height in Apolo Canton
 the community of Pata, its old church and the Sillakunka tunnel in Pata Canton
 the valley of the community of Virgen del Rosario, also named Tuichi, in Pata Canton at the shores of Tuichi River
 the community of Santa Cruz del Valle Ameno, the Billipiza waterfall of 22 m height in Vaquería and the archaeological site near Inca Viewpoint in Santa Cruz del Valle Ameno Canton
 Trinity festivity (Santísima Trinidad) in the community of Atén
 the pre-Columbian trails
 Turiapo River and its waterfall in the community of Pucasucho
 Ayara waterfall of about 18 m height in the community of Munaypatac
In Pelechuco Municipality:
 Katantika, one of the most important peaks of the Apolobamba mountain range, about 5,592 m high, in Pelechuco Canton
 the colonial town of Pelechuco
 the village of Queara near Pelechuco which is also situated in the highest area of Madidi National Park
 the Ulla Ulla National Reserve in Ulla Ulla Canton, today a part of the Apolobamba Integrated Management Natural Area
 the pre-Hispanic Guanan ruins in Pelechuco Canton
 Cololo Lake in Antaquilla de Copacabana Canton
 Suches Lake on the border to Peru

Other remarkable places are Pilón Lajas Biosphere Reserve and Communal Lands, Chalalan Lake and Chalalan ecolodge.

See also 
 K'ayrani Quta
 K'iski Quta

References 

 

Provinces of La Paz Department (Bolivia)